The 2012–13 EWHL Super Cup was the second edition of the EWHL Super Cup, a women's ice hockey tournament organized by the Elite Women's Hockey League (EWHL).

Three participants from the 2011–12 EWHL Super Cup - ESC Planegg/Würmtal, the ZSC Lions, and EHV Sabres Wien - returned for the 2012-13 tournament. They were joined by three new teams, ECDC Memmingen, HK Pantera Minsk, and the DEC Salzburg Eagles. HC Slovan Bratislava and OSC Berlin, participants in the 2011-12 tournament, did not return for the 2012-13 competition.

Tournament

Results

Final table

References

EWHL Super Cup
EWHL Super Cup